Fin Dome is an  granite summit located 1.5 mile west of the crest of the Sierra Nevada mountain range, in the southeast corner of Fresno County, in northern California. Nearby peaks include Black Mountain  to the east, and Mount Rixford  to the south-southeast. The John Muir Trail passes to the east of this landmark, providing an approach. This geographical feature was named by Bolton Brown in 1899 when he explored the lake basin in its vicinity, because it resembled the fin of a sea serpent. The first ascent of the summit was made in 1910 by James Rennie, one of the foremost mountaineers of the Sierra Club.

Climate
According to the Köppen climate classification system, Fin Dome is located in an alpine climate zone. Most weather fronts originate in the Pacific Ocean, and travel east toward the Sierra Nevada mountains. As fronts approach, they are forced upward by the peaks, causing them to drop their moisture in the form of rain or snowfall onto the range (orographic lift). Precipitation runoff from this peak drains into tributaries of the South Fork Kings River.

Gallery

See also

 List of mountain peaks of California

References

External links
 Weather forecast: Fin Dome
 Fin Dome: USGS

Mountains of Fresno County, California
Mountains of Kings Canyon National Park
North American 3000 m summits
Mountains of Northern California
Sierra Nevada (United States)